Severe Cyclonic Storm Mandous was the third cyclonic storm, as well as the third most intense tropical cyclone of the 2022 North Indian Ocean cyclone season. The remnants of the system later regenerated into Deep Depression ARB 03 in the Arabian Sea. The system struck the Andaman and Nicobar Islands, as well as South India.

Meteorological history

The Indian Meteorological Department issued a bulletin stating that a tropical depression had formed in the Bay of Bengal and was designated BOB 09. The JTWC, released a TCFA on the system, stating that it could intensify further, because of very warm waters and low to moderate wind shear, designating it Invest 96B. A day later, both the JTWC and IMD classified this low pressure as a "cyclonic storm" and it was named Mandous. As it continued tracking westward, land interaction caused in to fall to Cyclonic Storm intensity. It later made landfall around Chennai, India as a Deep Depression. It fell to Depression intensity, and later degenerated into a remnant low.

Regeneration
On December 14, the remnants of Cyclone Mandous regenerated into a depression in the Arabian Sea, and it was called ARB 03. The Joint Typhoon Warning Center dubbed it as Invest 97A. Although forecasted to quickly degenerate into a remnant low, ARB 03 intensified into a Deep Depression, according to the Indian Meteorological Department, and the JTWC dubbed it as Cyclone 07A. After reaching peak intensity, the Low-Level Circulation detached from the associated convection, and wind shear increased, starting a weakening trend. It weakened into a low pressure area at 12:00 UTC on December 17.

Preparations

In Puducherry and Karikal, collages and schools were closed in anticipation of the storm.

Impact

In Chennai, about 200 trees were uprooted due to Cyclone Mandous. Damage in Anantapur was Rs45 million (US$550 thousand). Four people died Tamil Nadu from heavy rains. Five fishermen went missing off the coast of Sri Lanka due to the storm.

See also

 Weather of 2022
 Tropical cyclones in 2022
 2022 North Indian Ocean cyclone season

Notes

References

External links

 JTWC Best Track Data of Tropical Cyclone 06B (Mandous)
 JTWC Best Track Data of Tropical Cyclone 07A (Seven)
06B.MANDOUS from the United States Naval Research Laboratory
07A.SEVEN from the United States Naval Research Laboratory

Mandous
2022 North Indian Ocean cyclone season
Severe cyclonic storms
Tropical cyclones in India
Tropical cyclones in Sri Lanka
2022 in Sri Lanka
2022 meteorology
2022 disasters in India
December 2022 events in India
2022 disasters in Asia